Hooper Township is one of fourteen townships in Dodge County, Nebraska, United States. The population was 1,160 at the 2020 census. A 2021 estimate placed the township's population at 1,131.

Most of the Village of Hooper as well as the entire Village of Winslow lies within the Township.

See also
County government in Nebraska

References

External links
City-Data.com

Townships in Dodge County, Nebraska
Townships in Nebraska